The British Best All-Rounder (BBAR) competition, organised by Cycling Time Trials, is an annual British cycle-racing competition. There are similar competitions for under-18s and teams of three. Qualifying races have to be ridden between April and September.

Certificates are awarded to men with 22 mph (35.5 km/h) or faster and women averaging 20 mph (32.25 km/h) or more. Competitions modelled on the BBAR are organised within UK regions, and for over-40s.

History
The BBAR was announced by the magazine Cycling on 4 April 1930. It offered an annual trophy valued at £26 and a shield to be held for a year by the winning team.

Time-trialling had been the staple of British cycling since the National Cyclists' Union (NCU) had banned massed racing on the road in 1888 as a reaction to police objections it feared would threaten all cyclists. The NCU wanted clubs to promote races only on tracks, or velodromes, but they were too distant and local groups began organising not the massed races that the NCU banned but individual competitions against the clock: time trials.

British cyclists came to see time-trialling as the purest form of competition, free as it was of the tactics of massed racing. But there was no reliable way of seeing who was the best all-rounder, over all distances and across a season, because difficulties with travel meant not all riders could take part. The BBAR overcame the problems by allowing riders to compete where they chose and then register their performances. According to time-trialling historian, Bernard Thompson: "It was probably the best thing that has ever happened to British time-trial sport, even to this day."

The first winner
The first winner was the South Londoner, Frank Southall, riding for the Norwood Paragon club. He averaged  and won again the following three years. After his fourth consecutive win, 7,000 cyclists watched at the Royal Albert Hall in London as Southall signed the Golden Book of Cycling during the BBAR prize-giving concert.

Change of ownership
The BBAR competition was suspended during the war. It restarted in 1944, promoted not by Cycling but by the time-trial administrative body, the Road Time Trials Council (RTTC), today known as Cycling Time Trials.

British cycling was by then in a civil war, with the NCU's ban on massed racing having been thwarted by a new organisation, the British League of Racing Cyclists (BLRC). Both the RTTC and Cycling had campaigned against the BLRC, still convinced massed racing threatened the sport as a whole. But the editor of Cycling, H. H. "Harry" England was so upset that the RTTC had taken over the BBAR that he changed sides and began reporting BLRC races.

After the war
Twelve-hour races would also have been hard to organise because, said Bernard Thompson: "Signposts had been taken down during the war and it is doubtful that a sufficient number of marshals and feeders could have been mustered in those austere times." In 1945 the competition returned to its full distance.

Tom Barlow
Calculations of riders' averages were made from 1945 to 1976 by a Manchester enthusiast, Tom Barlow. Bernard Thompson related: "All Tom's calculations were done the hard way; there were no pocket calculators in his lifetime and it is doubtful that he would have changed his tried and trusted methods, his tables of average speeds combined with his outsized slide-rule... about three feet long." Barlow died aged 90 in 1982.

Winners
The men's competition has been won eleven times by Kevin Dawson, two more than Ian Cammish (nine). The women's competition was for many years dominated by Beryl Burton, who won 25 times from 1959 to 1983 inclusive. The only other women to have won the competition more than twice are June Pitchford, who won three times in a row from 1984, and Julia Shaw who won a fourth title in 2010.

Three BBAR winners have competed in the Tour de France: Charlie Holland (1937), Peter Hill (1967), and Arthur Metcalfe (1967 and 1968); Metcalfe is the only one to have completed the event.

The winner of each competition is determined by a simple average of the average speeds over the three distances.  This average is not an average speed, since the distances are not used to weight the average.   The table below shows this
simple average as ``average speed``.

See also

 Individual time trial
 Time trialist

External links

References

Road bicycle races
Cycle races in the United Kingdom